Flor de Caña is a brand of Nicaraguan rum.

Flor de Caña may also refer to:

 Flor de caña, a 1948 Mexican film
 Flor de Caña FC, a Nicaraguan football team
 Flor de Caña Open, a golf tournament on the PGA Tour Latinoamérica

See also
 Caña (disambiguation)